Antoniuk may refer to:
Antoniuk (name)
Osiedle Antoniuk, Białystok, district of Białystok in Poland

See also